Julien Casoli (born 5 July 1982) is a Paralympian athlete, from Vesoul, France competing mainly in category T54 sprint events.

Julien competed in the 2008 Summer Paralympics in Beijing where he competed in the 400m, 800m and 1500m and was a member of the bronze medal-winning French team in the 4 × 400 m. He also competed in the 1500 m. event at the 2013 Mediterranean Games in Mersin, Turkey where he won gold medal (3:26:66).

External links
 
 

Paralympic athletes of France
Athletes (track and field) at the 2008 Summer Paralympics
Paralympic bronze medalists for France
Living people
Athletes (track and field) at the 2012 Summer Paralympics
Athletes (track and field) at the 2016 Summer Paralympics
Sportspeople from Vesoul
Knights of the Ordre national du Mérite
Medalists at the 2008 Summer Paralympics
Medalists at the 2012 Summer Paralympics
French male wheelchair racers
Mediterranean Games gold medalists for France
Mediterranean Games silver medalists for France
Athletes (track and field) at the 2009 Mediterranean Games
Athletes (track and field) at the 2013 Mediterranean Games
Mediterranean Games medalists in athletics
1982 births
Paralympic medalists in athletics (track and field)
Athletes (track and field) at the 2020 Summer Paralympics
21st-century French people